Semiotica is an academic journal covering semiotics. It is the official journal of the International Association for Semiotic Studies.

Publication
Since 2000, the journal publishes five issues per year. It is published in English and French.

Editors-in-chief 
The first editor-in-chief of Semiotica was Thomas Sebeok, who continued this job until his death in 2001. He was succeeded by Jean Umiker-Sebeok (2002–2004) and Marcel Danesi (2004–present)

See also 
Sign Systems Studies

External links
 Journals of semiotics in the world

Publications established in 1969
Semiotics journals
De Gruyter academic journals
Multilingual journals
5 times per year journals